A special election was held in  on October 13–14, 1794 to fill a vacancy left by the death of Alexander Gillon (A) on October 6, 1794.

Election results

Harper took his seat on February 9, 1795.

See also
 List of special elections to the United States House of Representatives
 United States House of Representatives elections, 1794 and 1795

References

South Carolina 1794 05
South Carolina 1794 05
1794 05
South Carolina 05
United States House of Representatives 05
United States House of Representatives 1794 05